Tropical Storm Barry was a rapidly forming tropical cyclone that made landfall on Florida, United States, in early June 2007. The second named storm of the 2007 Atlantic hurricane season, Barry developed from a trough of low pressure in the southeastern Gulf of Mexico on June 1. It tracked rapidly northeastward, reaching peak winds of  before weakening and making landfall near Tampa Bay as a tropical depression. Barry quickly lost tropical characteristics after wind shear removed much of the convection, and early on June 3, it completed the transition into an extratropical cyclone. The extratropical remnants tracked up the East Coast of the United States, and were absorbed by a larger extratropical cyclone on June 5.

Outer rainbands in Pinar del Río Province injured three people and damaged 55 houses. The rain caused some flooding and wet roads, which led to two indirect traffic fatalities. Rough seas killed one Florida surfer in Pinellas County. In Florida and Georgia, the precipitation assisted firefighters in combating severe wildfires. Overall damage from the storm was minor.

Meteorological history

By late on May 29, a weak trough over the Yucatán Peninsula produced a small area of convection over the Yucatán Channel. Convection increased in association with the trough, and the next day a broad envelope of cyclonic turning developed within the system. By May 30, the moisture from the trough extended from Nicaragua through the southeastern Gulf of Mexico, with the greatest area of convection near Cuba. A westward moving tropical wave spawned a broad area of low pressure on May 30, and by May 31, a circulation had developed within the system to the southeast of Cozumel, Mexico. The low moved north-northeastward, and gradually became better organized despite high amounts of vertical wind shear. The deep convection became more concentrated near the center, and it is estimated the system developed into a tropical depression at 12:00 UTC on June 1, just to the northwest of the western tip of Cuba. Operationally, the system was not classified until eleven hours later.

The depression developed a large area of squalls, and organized enough to warrant a Hurricane Hunters flight into the area.

Shortly after reaching peak intensity, strong wind shear removed most of the deep convection; the cloud pattern consisted of an exposed yet well-defined center surrounded by a curved convective band extending from Cuba along the eastern Gulf of Mexico. The center became elongated and weakened as it accelerated northeastward, and at 14:00 UTC on June 2, Barry made landfall near Tampa, Florida, as a weakening tropical depression. As the system continued inland, it rapidly lost tropical characteristics, and later that day the National Hurricane Center discontinued advisories on Barry, while it was located over northeastern Florida. The extratropical remnants strengthened, as the system continued northeastward, and on June 3, the storm moved ashore along the coast of South Carolina. Spiral bands developed to the north of the system as it moved up the coast, and a large plume of moisture extended well ahead of the low-level circulation. Late on June 4, the extratropical remnant entered New England, and late on June 5, the remnants of Barry were absorbed by a larger extratropical cyclone near the border between the U.S. state of Maine and the Canadian province of Quebec.

Preparations

Coinciding with its classification as a tropical storm, the National Hurricane Center issued a tropical storm warning for the west coast of Florida from Bonita Beach through Keaton Beach, with a tropical storm watch declared from Keaton Beach northward to Saint Marks. An inland tropical storm warning was also issued for non-coastal and non-tidal areas of Charlotte, Citrus, DeSoto, Hardee, Hernando, Highlands, Lee, Levy, Manatee, Pasco, Pinellas, Polk, Sarasota, and Sumter counties. The passage of the storm resulted in an increased threat for rip currents, with officials recommending that swimmers stay out of the water until the storm leaves the area. A tornado watch was also posted for the southern portion of the state, though was dropped after the storm weakened.

After becoming an extratropical cyclone, local National Weather Service offices issued flood watches for portions of South Carolina, much of eastern North Carolina, southeastern Virginia, and southeastern Maryland. Later, flood and flash flood watches were issued for southeast Pennsylvania, northern Delaware, northern New Jersey, east-central New York, and southern New England. Wind and lake wind advisories were posted in parts of Georgia.

Impact

Caribbean

The city of Guane was isolated after flooding cut off communications. In total, more than 2,000 people were evacuated due to the threat for flooding. Additionally, the precursor disturbance spawned four tornadoes in Pinar del Río Province; the tornadoes injured three people and damaged fifty-five houses, of which four collapsed.

United States

Florida
The rainfall alleviated persistent drought conditions and assisted in combating severe wildfires across the state. In Brevard County, the rainfall closed a portion of Eau Gallie Boulevard after a large sinkhole developed. Several other roads across the area were flooded, and on Interstate 95 near Lake Worth, a sinkhole closed two lanes of traffic. Wet roads caused several traffic accidents across the state; in both Brevard and Volusia counties, a motorist was killed from an accident. On Interstate 4, a tractor trailer led to disruptions near Orlando after it crashed into a guardrail.

The increased ocean action caused minor flooding along several roads in the Tampa Bay area, which trapped some automobile travelers. At Indian Shores, a woman died after sustaining injuries from the rough surf.

High winds across the state included a report of  near the state's southeastern coastline. The winds downed some trees and resulted in power outages, and one person in Carrolwood was injured after a tree fell onto a house. The storm spawned several tornadoes in the southern portion of the state, some of which damaged fences and power lines. One possible tornado in Goulds left about 2,000 people without power after it knocked down a power line. Another tornado near Miami damaged a few homes and trees.

Elsewhere

The precipitation assisted firefighters in combating wildfires in the southern portion of the state, which gave thousands of workers a brief respite after they had fought the fires daily for over a month. The rainfall caused some minor flooding, and in Savannah a few minor traffic accidents occurred. Gusty winds blew down trees and power lines, and along the coast, rough surf was reported. Heavy rainfall from the storm spread across much of the East Coast of the United States. State totals peaked at  near Hardeeville, South Carolina,  in Fuquay-Varina, North Carolina, and  near Pennington Gap, Virginia. High winds also occurred in South Carolina.

The extratropical remnants of Barry produced gusty winds along the Atlantic coastline which peaked at  near Charleston, South Carolina. Around 200 houses in Craven County, North Carolina, were without power after winds downed a power line. In North Carolina, adverse conditions from the storm delayed an elimination baseball game between the East Carolina University and Western Carolina University teams. In southeastern Virginia, the remnants of Barry caused over 60 traffic accidents, which resulted in 10 injuries. Rough seas off of Cape Fear left a sailboat containing three people requiring rescue from the Coast Guard. The remnants of Tropical Storm Barry contributed to heavy rainfall and flooding in the Finger Lakes region of New York State. Roads and several driveways were washed out. Flash flooding was also reported in southeast New York, and high wind gusts caused sporadic tree damage. In New Jersey, northeast onshore flow associated with the remnants of Barry produced high tides and minor coastal flooding.

See also

 List of Florida hurricanes (2000–present)
 List of New England hurricanes
 List of New Jersey hurricanes
 List of New York hurricanes
 List of North Carolina hurricanes (2000–present)
 Timeline of the 2007 Atlantic hurricane season
 Other storms of the same name
 Tropical Storm Alberto (2006)
 Tropical Storm Andrea (2013)
 Tropical Storm Colin (2016)

References

External links

 
 HPC rainfall page for Barry

2007 Atlantic hurricane season
Atlantic tropical storms
Hurricanes in Cuba
Hurricanes in Florida
Hurricanes in Georgia (U.S. state)
Hurricanes in South Carolina
Hurricanes in North Carolina
Hurricanes in Virginia
Hurricanes in Maryland
Hurricanes in Delaware
Hurricanes in New Jersey
Hurricanes in Pennsylvania
Hurricanes in New York (state)
Hurricanes in New England
Tropical Storm Barry
Barry